Cameron Judge (born November 29, 1994) is a Canadian football linebacker for the Calgary Stampeders of the Canadian Football League (CFL).  After being selected second overall in the 2017 CFL Draft by the Saskatchewan Roughriders, he played three seasons for the team from 2017 to 2019. Judge has also been a member of the Toronto Argonauts.

Early life 
Judge was born on November 29, 1994, in Montreal, Quebec, to actor Christopher Judge and Margaret Judge (née Schinke), a former model. The family moved from Montreal (where Christopher Judge had been working on a television show) to Los Angeles when Judge was three months old. When Judge was three years old, the family moved to British Columbia and split their time living between Vancouver and Victoria. It was during his time in Vancouver, that Judge developed an interest in football and started playing minor football. When Judge was twelve years old, the family moved back to California, primarily to give Judge and his older brother, Christopher, a better environment to develop their football skills.

High school 

After one year as a running back and linebacker for the junior varsity team, Judge became a three-year varsity starter at linebacker for Oaks Christian School in Westlake Village, California, under the coaching of Bill Redell and legendary NFL linebacker Clay Matthews Jr. Judge was rated a 4 star recruit and a top 5 linebacker on the West Coast according to scout.com. Selected to the Tom Lemming list of top 25 outside linebackers. Maxpreps.com 2012 Preseason All-Southern California team

College football career 
Judge accepted a scholarship offer from UCLA where he played college football for the team from 2013 to 2016 and was a team co-captain in 2015. He and other members of the defensive unit for UCLA were considered the best group of players in the linebacker position in the Pac-12 Conference. During his time there Judge played both inside and outside linebacker positions, and was a special teams captain for the Pac-12 Conference team.

Professional career

Saskatchewan Roughriders
In 2019, he was the unanimous selection for Saskatchewan Roughriders Most Outstanding Canadian, and was named a finalist for CFL Most Outstanding Canadian. After the CFL canceled the 2020 season due to the COVID-19 pandemic, Judge chose to opt-out of his contract with the Roughriders on August 28, 2020. Judge played three seasons for the Riders, appearing in 38 games, registering 102 tackles, 7 quarterback sacks, two interceptions, two forced fumbles and one defensive touchdown.

Toronto Argonauts
On February 17, 2021, it was announced that Judge had signed a one-year contract with the Toronto Argonauts. He played in nine regular season games where he recorded 13 defensive tackles and one special teams tackle.

Calgary Stampeders
On February 4, 2022, Judge was traded to the Calgary Stampeders in exchange for Royce Metchie as both players had contracts expiring the following week. Judge and the Stamps agreed to a contract later that same day. In September 2022 Judge was suspended one game for punching B.C. Lions wide receiver Lucky Whitehead in post-game altercation.

References

1994 births
Living people
American football linebackers
Anglophone Quebec people
Calgary Stampeders players
Canadian football linebackers
Canadian players of American football
Canadian people of African-American descent
Players of Canadian football from Quebec
Saskatchewan Roughriders players
Canadian football people from Montreal
Toronto Argonauts players
UCLA Bruins football players